Klaus Hendriksen (born 1 July 1937) is a Brazilian sailor. He competed in the Flying Dutchman event at the 1964 Summer Olympics.

References

External links
 
 

1937 births
Living people
Brazilian male sailors (sport)
Olympic sailors of Brazil
Sailors at the 1964 Summer Olympics – Flying Dutchman
Sportspeople from Hamburg